is a Japanese former professional tennis player.

Fukuoka, a two-time French Open quarter-finalist in doubles, featured in 16 Federation Cup ties for Japan as a doubles specialist and won a total of 12 matches.

At the 1974 Asian Games in Tehran, Fukuoka partnered with Toshiko Sade to win the women's doubles event. She was also a silver medalist at the 1973 University Games.

WTA Finals

Doubles (0–2)

Other finals

Doubles

See also
List of Japan Fed Cup team representatives

References

External links
 
 

1949 births
Living people
Japanese female tennis players
Asian Games gold medalists for Japan
Asian Games bronze medalists for Japan
Tennis players at the 1974 Asian Games
Medalists at the 1974 Asian Games
Asian Games medalists in tennis
Universiade medalists in tennis
Universiade silver medalists for Japan
Medalists at the 1973 Summer Universiade
20th-century Japanese women
21st-century Japanese women